Barley mild mosaic bymovirus is a plant virus.

See also
See the article in French, "Jaunisse nanisante de l'orge":
https://fr.wikipedia.org/wiki/Jaunisse_nanisante_de_l%27orge

References
 Brunt, A.A., Crabtree, K., Dallwitz, M.J., Gibbs, A.J., Watson, L. and Zurcher, E.J. (eds.)  (1996 onwards).  Barley mild mosaic bymovirus. Plant Viruses Online: Descriptions and Lists from the VIDE Database. Version: 20 August 1996.

Bymoviruses
Viral plant pathogens and diseases